Charles Stewart Rolls  (27 August 1877 – 12 July 1910) was a British motoring and aviation pioneer. With Henry Royce, he co-founded the Rolls-Royce car manufacturing firm. He was the first Briton to be killed in an aeronautical accident with a powered aircraft, when the tail of his Wright Flyer broke off during a flying display in Bournemouth. He was aged 32.

Early life

Rolls was born in Berkeley Square, London, third son of the 1st Baron Llangattock and Lady Llangattock. Despite his London birth, he retained a strong family connection with his ancestral home of The Hendre, near Monmouth, Wales. After attending Mortimer Vicarage Preparatory School in Berkshire, he was educated at Eton College where his developing interest in engines earned him the nickname "dirty Rolls".

In 1894, he attended a private crammer in Cambridge which helped him gain entry to Trinity College, Cambridge in 1895, where he studied mechanical and applied science. In 1896, at the age of 18, he travelled to Paris to buy his first car, a Peugeot Phaeton, and joined the Automobile Club of France. His Peugeot is believed to have been the first car based in Cambridge, and one of the first three cars owned in Wales. An early motoring enthusiast, he joined the Self-Propelled Traffic Association, which campaigned against the restrictions imposed on motor vehicles by the Locomotive Acts, and became a founder member of the Automobile Club of Great Britain, with which the Association merged in 1897.

Rolls was a keen cyclist and spent time at Cambridge bicycle racing. In 1896, he won a Half Blue and the following year became captain of the Cambridge University Bicycle Club.

Rolls graduated from Cambridge in 1898 and began working on the steam yacht Santa Maria followed by a position at the London and North Western Railway in Crewe. However, his talents lay more in salesmanship and motoring pioneering than practical engineering; in January 1903, with the help of £6,600 provided by his father, he started one of Britain's first car dealerships, C. S. Rolls & Co. based in Lillie Hall, Fulham, to import and sell French Peugeot and Belgian Minerva vehicles.

Partnership with Royce

Rolls was introduced to Henry Royce by a friend at the Royal Automobile Club, Henry Edmunds, who was also a director of Royce Ltd. Edmunds showed him Royce's car and arranged the historic meeting between Rolls and Royce at the Midland Hotel, Manchester, on 4 May 1904. In spite of his preference for three or four cylinder cars, Rolls was impressed with the two-cylinder Royce 10 and in a subsequent agreement of 23 December 1904 agreed to take all the cars Royce could make. These would be of two, three, four and six cylinders and would be badged as Rolls-Royces.

The first Rolls-Royce car, the Rolls-Royce 10 hp, was unveiled at the Paris Salon in December 1904, although in the early advertising it was the name of Rolls that was emphasised over that of Royce. In 1906 Rolls and Royce formalised their partnership by creating Rolls-Royce Limited, with Rolls appointed Technical managing director on a salary of £750 per annum plus 4% of the profits in excess of £10,000. Rolls provided the financial backing and business acumen to complement Royce's technical expertise. In 1907 Rolls-Royce Limited bought out C. S. Rolls & Co.

Rolls put much effort into publicising the quietness and smoothness of the Rolls-Royce, and at the end of 1906 travelled to the US to promote the new cars. The company was winning awards for the quality and reliability of its cars by 1907. But by 1909 Rolls' interest in the business was waning, and at the end of the year he resigned as Technical managing director and became a non-executive director.

Pioneer aviator

Rolls was a pioneer aviator and initially, balloonist, making over 170 balloon ascents. In 1903 he won the Gordon Bennett Gold Medal for the longest single flight time.

By 1907 Rolls' interest turned increasingly to flying and he tried to persuade Royce to design an aero engine. He became the second Briton to go up in an aeroplane. Piloted by Wilbur Wright their flight on 8 October 1908 from Camp d'Auvours, eleven kilometres east of Le Mans, lasted four minutes and twenty seconds. He bought one of six Wright Flyer aircraft built by Short Brothers under licence from the Wright Brothers and from early October 1909 made more than 200 flights. Founder in 1901 with Frank Hedges Butler of the ballooning club that became the Royal Aero Club in March 1910 he was the second person they licensed to fly an aeroplane. He became the first man to make a non-stop double crossing of the English Channel by plane taking 95 minutes on 2 June 1910. For this feat, which included the first eastbound aerial crossing of the English Channel, he was awarded the Gold Medal of the Royal Aero Club. There is a statue in Monmouth to commemorate the flight and another, by Kathleen Scott, in Dover.

Death

On 12 July 1910, at the age of 32, Rolls was killed in an air crash at Hengistbury Airfield, Southbourne, Bournemouth when the tail of his Wright Flyer broke off during a flying display. He was the first Briton to be killed in an aeronautical accident with a powered aircraft, and the eleventh person internationally. His was also the first powered aviation fatality in the United Kingdom.

His grave lies at the churchyard of St Cadoc's Church, Llangattock-Vibon-Avel, where many of the Rolls family lie buried in various family tombs. His grave is just below Llangattock Manor and bears the inscription:

"Blessed are the pure in heart for they shall see God."

A statue in his memory, in which he is seen holding a biplane model, was erected in Agincourt Square, Monmouth. A further memorial to him was unveiled in 1981 in the bottom playing field of St Peter's Catholic School, Bournemouth, which was developed on the site of Hengistbury Airfield. There is a stained-glass window in All Saints' Church, Eastchurch on the Isle of Sheppey, dedicated jointly to Rolls and to fellow pioneer aviator Cecil Grace.

A memorial to Charles Rolls was dedicated 12th July 2022, at Hengistbury Head, Southbourne, Dorset, between the car park and the Hiker cafe.

This was the same day, date and time as it was in 1910 at the time of his crash at Southbourne, Hampshire [as it was at the time] when the tail came off of his Wright Flyer during a flying display on the airfield at what is now St Peters School.

[With thanks to Stephen Robson, Chairman, Charles Rolls Heritage Trust.]

Cultural Depictions
Actor Robert Powell portrays Rolls in the 1972-1973 miniseries The Edwardians.

Note

References

External links
Charles Rolls Heritage Trust https://crht1910.org.uk/
 
  – More about Charles Rolls
  – Transcription of the report of his death in a contemporary newspaper
  – Old Photo of Rolls and the Royal Family
  – Charles Rolls goes on his first aeroplane flight with Wilbur Wright on 8 October 1908 at Camp D'Auvours, France
 Charles Stewart Rolls Statue, Dover Seafront – Post-renovation photograph and description

1877 births
1910 deaths
People from Westminster
People from Fulham
Alumni of Trinity College, Cambridge
People educated at Eton College
Welsh aviators
People from Monmouthshire
Aviators killed in aviation accidents or incidents in England
Rolls-Royce people
British automobile designers
British founders of automobile manufacturers
Younger sons of barons
Members of the Early Birds of Aviation
English people of Welsh descent
British automotive pioneers
Burials in Wales
Monmouth, Wales
British balloonists
Victims of aviation accidents or incidents in 1910
Charles
Welsh racing drivers
19th-century Welsh businesspeople